Sainte-Hélène-de-Mancebourg is a parish municipality in northwestern Quebec, Canada in the Abitibi-Ouest Regional County Municipality. It covers 68.15 km² and had a population of 410 as of the Canada 2021 Census.

The township was incorporated on May 10, 1941.

Demographics 

Population trend:
 Population in 2021: 410 (2006 to 2011 population change: 9.9%)
 Population in 2016: 373 
 Population in 2011: 354 
 Population in 2006: 375
 Population in 2001: 384
 Population in 1996: 415
 Population in 1991: 398

Mother tongue:
 English as first language: 0%
 French as first language: 100%
 English and French as first language: 0%
 Other as first language: 0%

Municipal council
 Mayor: Florent Bédard
 Councillors: Frank Fournier, Lucien Major, Raymond Matte, Raymonde Petitclerc, Sylvain Pomerleau, Careen Vachon

References

Parish municipalities in Quebec
Incorporated places in Abitibi-Témiscamingue